Bianca Byington (born 23 October 1966) is a Brazilian actress.

Biography 

At eleven years old, she began her career as a member of the choir, the first staging of the musical The acrobats, Chico Buarque. At thirteen, she filmed the feature film Tormenta, Umberto Molo and two years later shared the Kikito for best supporting actress Carla Camurati and Ruthinéia de Moraes, the Festival de Gramado.

Around the same time, won the title of the Rio summer muse and starred in the film Garota Dourada, Antônio Calmon, who return to work a few years later, in such productions as Corpo Dourado and O Beijo do Vampiro, displayed by Rede Globo in 1998 and 2002, respectively.

In 1986 she made her television debut, at the hands of director Roberto Talma, the miniseries Anos Dourados by Gilberto Braga, displayed by Rede Globo, where she lived and the character Marina, one of the best friends of the protagonist Maria de Lourdes, lived by actress Malu Mader. Even on television, lived unforgettable characters such as the hilarious Téia of Perigosas Peruas (1992), and Gertrudes de Sá in A Padroeira (2001). In 2004, gave birth to the Maria da Encarnação Junqueira, an insecure woman in the soap opera Como uma Onda, Walter Negrão.

Already in 2006, returning from Portugal, where she was invited to film director José Fonseca e Costa the film Viúva Rica Solteira Não Fica, Byington was invited by Carlos Lombardi, author of Perigosas Peruas, who has also had worked at Quatro por Quatro (1994), to make a cameo on the soap opera Bang Bang, where she played the widow Jones.

In 2008, she participated in two episodes of the show Casos e Acasos, and that same year participated in the soap opera Três Irmãs by Antônio Calmon. In 2009, the series makes cameo Toma Lá, Dá Cá, Chico e Amigos and S.O.S. Emergência. In 2011, makes a cameo on the soap opera Insensato Coração.

In 2012, the episode was "A Fofoqueira de Porto Alegre" in series As Brasileiras.

In 2013, she was hired by Rede Record will be where the first novel of author Carlos Lombardi in broadcast. Byington and Lombardi worked together in Perigosas Peruas (1992) and Quatro por Quatro (1994).

Filmography

Television

Internet

Film 

 1980 - Tormenta, of Umberto Molo
 1984 - Garota Dourada, of Antônio Calmon
 1984 - Amor Voraz, of Walter Hugo Khouri
 1987 - A Mulher Fatal Encontra o Homem Ideal (short film), of Carla Camurati
 1997 - For All - O Trampolim da Vitória, of Buza Ferraz e Luiz Carlos Lacerda
 2000 - Estorvo, of Ruy Guerra
 2000 - O Barato é Ser Careta, of Tizuka Yamasaki
 2000 - Deus Jr., of Mauro Lima
 2004 - A Dona da História, of Daniel Filho
 2006 - Trair e coçar é só começar, of Moacyr Góes
 2006 - Viúva Rica Solteira Não Fica, of José Fonseca e Costa
 2007 - A Última Juventude, of Domingos de Oliveira
 2012 - Eu Não Faço a Menor Ideia do que eu Tô Fazendo Com a Minha Vida, of Matheus Souza
 2012 - Noites de Reis, of Vinícius Reis 
 2017 - Minha Família Perfeita, of Felipe Joffily

References

External links 

1966 births
Living people
Actresses from Rio de Janeiro (city)
Brazilian people of American descent
Brazilian telenovela actresses
Brazilian film actresses
Brazilian stage actresses
20th-century Brazilian actresses
21st-century Brazilian actresses